Shinchireem is a South Korean rock band. Their members consist of Yoon Jong-shin, Jo Jung-chi and Hareem. Shinchireem is currently signed to Mystic Entertainment. Shinchireem released their first single, "Unknown Number" on February, 2012.

Discography

Studio albums 

 Episode 01 旅行 (2012)

Singles

References

External links
 

Mystic Entertainment artists
South Korean indie rock groups
South Korean folk rock groups